The Urquijists were a monarchist political group in the province of Álava during the Spanish Restoration period.

References

Defunct political parties in Spain
Political parties established in 1880
Political parties disestablished in 1923
1880 establishments in Spain
1923 disestablishments in Spain
Restoration (Spain)